Professional Power is a political group based in Sai Kung District, Hong Kong. The group is formed and led by Christine Fong, a former member of the Liberal Party. The group markets itself as nonpartisan and currently has four members in the Sai Kung District Council.

In the 2015 Hong Kong local elections, Professional Power fielded nine candidates, with four getting elected. The group fielded seven candidates in the 2019 election, with three elected eventually.

Political stance 

Professional Power has been widely considered as a moderate political organization, and has been competing directly with both pro-Beijing camp and the pro-democracy camp.

And yet, in 2016 Hong Kong legislative election, it was reported that the Hong Kong Liaison Office has been trying to "allocate" the votes to Fong. 

In 2019 Hong Kong local elections, many candidates of the Professional Power were not challenged by any parties or independent politicians from the pro-Beijing camp. Prior to the polling day, there was a list widely circulated in LIHKG and Factcheck.io. The list claimed itself as a list of candidates endorsed by Hong Kong Federation of Trade Unions. The list has included six candidates from the Professional Power.

In the 2021 Legislative Council election, Lam So-wai ran in the New Territories South East, receiving nominations from a member of Chinese People's Political Consultative Conference (CPPCC) Paul Kwong and other pro-Beijing stance. Christine Fong was also rumoured to have been "blessed" and approved by Chinese Government to run in the election. The group later was branded as part of pro-Beijing camp, despite Lam rejected the labeling and insisted the group as "pro-livelihood group".

Performance in elections

Legislative Council elections

See also
Path of Democracy
Third Side
Hope for Hong Kong

References

Political parties established in 2010
Political parties in Hong Kong
Conservative parties in Hong Kong
2010 establishments in Hong Kong